Sts. Cyril and Methodius Parish is a Roman Catholic church in Bridgeport, Connecticut, now part of the  Diocese of Bridgeport.

History 
Sts. Cyril and Methodius was the second of two of Bridgeport's Slovak national parishes created out of the parish of St. John Nepomucene Slovak National Church (1891-1991).  This elegant Romanesque Revival church dates from shortly after the parish's founding in 1905. The New York City church architect, Joseph A. Jackson, designed the building.

Father Stephen Panik, for whom Father Panik Village was named, had been the church's pastor from the early 1930s until his death in 1953.

The church, itself, was initially established by the St. Joseph Society, with its materials and records integral to the foundations of the St. Stephen's Society and the National Slovak Society respectively.

Institute of Christ the King Sovereign Priest 

Since October 8, 2017, the church has been placed under the pastoral care of the Institute of Christ the King Sovereign Priest.

They celebrate Mass in accordance with the 1962 Roman Missal in Latin, as is authorized by Pope Benedict XVI's motu proprio Summorum Pontificum. This is the only Catholic church in Bridgeport that has a regularly scheduled  Mass in that form.

References

External links 
 St. Cyril and Methodius - Diocesan information 
 Diocese of Bridgeport

Romanesque Revival church buildings in Connecticut
Roman Catholic churches completed in 1905
20th-century Roman Catholic church buildings in the United States
Roman Catholic churches in Bridgeport, Connecticut
Roman Catholic Diocese of Bridgeport
National parishes
Slovak-American history
1905 establishments in Connecticut
Churches used by the Institute of Christ the King Sovereign Priest